Abraham Eisenstark (born September 5, 1919, Warsaw, Poland – August 28, 2018) was an American professor of microbiology. He was a Guggenheim Fellow for the academic year 1958–1959.

Biography
As a child, Eisenstark immigrated to the United States from Poland. After education (including junior college) in Kansas City public schools, he graduated with A.B. and M.A. from the University of Illinois. His study for a Ph.D. in microbiology was interrupted by WW II. He became a technical sergeant in the 8th Medical Laboratory of the U.S. Army Medical Service from 1942 to 1945. His service in the Pacific involved diagnostic procedures for malaria. He returned to graduate study at the University of Illinois and became a research assistant in charge of electron microscopy.

 (Note: The tribute to Eisenstark from the Division of Biological Sciences at the University of Missouri cited the wrong journal for his work on penicillin. This work was published in the Journal of Bacteriology. The paper that appeared in the journal Science in 1947 reported electron micrographs of X-ray treated Escherichia coli.)

Eisenstark was a faculty member from 1948 to 1951 at Oklahoma State University and from 1951 to 1971 at Kansas State University. For the academic year 1958–1959 he was on sabbatical as a Guggenheim Fellow at Ole Maaløe's laboratory in Copenhagen. From 1968 to 1969 he spent 15 months on sabbatical at the National Science Foundation as a program director for molecular biology. In 1971 he resigned from Kansas State University to become a professor at the University of Missouri, where he was the head of the Division of Biological Sciences from 1971 to 1980.

At the University of Missouri, in 1990 he went into mandatory retirement as professor emeritus. In 1990 he became the director of Cancer Research Center (near Ellis Fischel Cancer Center) in Columbia, Missouri. There he continued doing research for the next twenty years.

Eisenstark supervised 20 doctoral students. His first wife, Roma Gould Eisenstark of Chickasha Oklahoma, died in 1984. They had a daughter and two sons. His second wife was Joan Ragsdell Eisenstark. Abe Eisenstark died on August 28, 2018. A memorial/ birthday celebration was held later that week on what would have been his 99th birthday at the Unitarian Fellowship in Columbia Missouri.

Selected publications

Articles

Books

References

External links

1919 births
2018 deaths
American microbiologists
American molecular biologists
Phage workers
American people of Polish-Jewish descent
University of Illinois alumni
Kansas State University faculty
University of Missouri faculty